Dave Simpson (born January 11, 1983 as David Anthony Simpson Knight) is a Canadian retired footballer.

Youth career
Simpson began his youth career with North Scarborough SC, where he played until he was 17. During his time with NSSC, he earned a trial with Southampton F.C. following an appearance at the Welsh International Super Cup, where he was named the Golden Boot Winner, scoring 14 goals in 5 matches.

He then joined the Erin Mills Soccer Club, as part of their Professional Soccer Academy (PSA). In 2001, he travelled to Stuttgart, Germany with PSA, where they played against various teams including against the youth academy of VfB Stuttgart, where he impressed the Stuttgart coach, who got Simpson to play the second half with his team. After a brief trial with the VfB Stuttgart U19 side, he signed later on that summer and remained with them till the end of 2001.

Professional career

After leaving Stuttgart, he had agreed to join Hungarian side MTK Budapest, but three days later they had a match in Belgium, where he instead signed a five year contract with Belgium first division side Royal Antwerp FC, although due to complications with getting his ITC from Canada, he was limited to playing in only exhibition matches for three months. However, the club went through financial difficulties and he left the club in the summer of 2002.

In 2003, he returned to Canada to sign with Hamilton Thunder of the Canadian Professional Soccer League. He recorded his first goal for Hamilton on June 7, 2003 against the Durham Flames. He helped Hamilton win their first title as Western Conference  champions, although they were eliminated in the semi-finals of the playoffs by the Vaughan Sun Devils, by a score of 2–0. After a contract disputes with the organization, he missed the entire 2004 season, due to Hamilton owning his player rights.

On April 19, 2005, he joined the Toronto Lynx of the USL First Division. He made his debut for the Lynx on April 23, 2005 against the Portland Timbers. He recorded his first two goals for the Lynx in a 4–4 draw against the Puerto Rico Islanders on May 28, 2005. 

In 2006, after an impressive season in Toronto he departed to Europe once more to sign with Lombard-Pápa TFC of the Borsodi Liga. At the end of season, Lombard-Pápa were relegated. 

In the summer of 2006, he became the first Canadian-born player to be signed by Czech giants AC Sparta Prague. After an early season coaching change bringing in Michal Bílek as coach, Simpson was loaned to newly promoted side SK Kladno. He scored in his second game for the club, however, in a match against FK Teplice, he suffered a concussion, leaving the game on a stretcher, forcing him to miss the remainder of the season, apart from a single appearance against Sparta as a late game substitute.

In the summer of 2007, he extended his contract with Spart Prague for two more years. However, he was soon sent to the reserve team, before eventually going on loan to FK SIAD Most in early 2008. Simpson was a starter until he suffered a car crash which kept him out of action for two more weeks. Simpson was reportedly linked Nottingham Forest of the English Championship Division after a brief stay at the club's grounds early May 2008. In the summer of 2008, Simpson and Sparta agreed to terminate the remainder of his contract.

He went on trial with Viborg FF and Toronto FC, before ultimately signing with Hungarian side Dunaújváros FC, finishing as the club's top goal scorer with five goals. In February 2009, Dunaújváros folded due to financial problems. He then joined Integrál-DAC, where he finished with 11 goals as the club's top goal scorer, but then Integrál-DAC also folded in the summer of 2009 leaving him as a free agent.

On June 25, 2009, he played as part of the Zinedine Zidane squad in a charity match against the Canadian All-Stars. Zidane had a part in the tying goal during added time, passing to his right to Simpson, who found Yannick Lewis in front of the goal for the tap in.

In July 2010, he was signed by Thai Premier League side Chonburi becoming once more the first Canadian to play in the league. He scored his first goal in his second game against Pattaya United. During his time with Chonburi he won the Thai F.A Cup in 2010. The following year, he retired from competitive soccer due to injuries. 

In April 2011, he came out of retirement to sign with his home club Mississauga Eagles FC of the Canadian Soccer League, and was named the team captain. In 2012, he signed with Brantford Galaxy, recording seven goals in ten matches. After the sacking of head coach Ron Davidson, eight players including with Simpson, sided with Davidson which led to their departure from the team.

International career
He is a former member of U17, U18, and U20 Canada national teams, appeared in 4 matches scoring 1 goal in 2003. Played with the U20 National Team at the 2003 US Soccer Festival. 

He has recently been called into multiple senior men's camps. In the summer of 2007, he was part of the player pool for the 2007 Gold Cup. He earned his first cap with Canada's senior team on 30 January 2008 , during a 1-0 win over Martinique).

Honours
Club
AC Sparta Prague:
Gambrinus liga Championship: 2007
Champions League Qualification in 2007
Chonburi:
Thailand FA Cup Champions in 2010

Personal life
Simpson is the son of a Portuguese and Bajan mother Ann Knight, and a Jamaican father Bovrell Simpson. His family tree dates back to African heritage. He was born in Toronto, Ontario and raised in North York.

In the winter of 2010 while on winter break from Chonburi, he was diagnosed with Stargardt Eye Disease, a disease which affects the central vision and can cause legal blindness. He had been suffering from the disease since the age of 18, but was unaware of its rare strain in his family. Dave became a father on September 24, 2011, with a daughter named Jaya. He married ex-Czech model Janelle Nathaniel in 2012.

Simpson to this day is the highest transfer the Toronto Lynx and Lombard-Pápa TFC have ever made and is to date the highest purchase that SK Kladno has ever made per loan spell. He was and remains the only Canadian to ever play for Thai Premier league giants Chonburi F.C.

References

External links
Dave Simpson Sparta Praha UEFA

Career stats - Hungary and Czech Republic Teams
Simpson's Grand Finale video
YIFootball Official Website

1983 births
Living people
Association football forwards
Association football wingers
Black Canadian soccer players
Canada men's international soccer players
Canadian expatriate soccer players
Canadian expatriate sportspeople in the Czech Republic
Canadian expatriate sportspeople in Hungary
Canadian people of Barbadian descent
Canadian sportspeople of Jamaican descent
Canadian Soccer League (1998–present) players
Canadian soccer players
Royal Antwerp F.C. players
Dave Simpson
Czech First League players
Dunaújváros FC players
Expatriate footballers in Hungary
Expatriate footballers in the Czech Republic
Expatriate footballers in Thailand
Hamilton Thunder players
AC Sparta Prague players
Integrál-DAC footballers
FK Baník Most players
Lombard-Pápa TFC footballers
Nemzeti Bajnokság I players
SK Kladno players
Soccer players from Toronto
Sportspeople from Scarborough, Toronto
Toronto Lynx players
USL First Division players
Mississauga Eagles FC players
Brantford Galaxy players
Nemzeti Bajnokság II players